The North East Lanarkshire by-election was a Parliamentary by-election held on 9 March 1911. It returned one Member of Parliament (MP)  to the House of Commons of the Parliament of the United Kingdom, elected by the first past the post voting system.

Electoral history

Candidates

Although there had been no Labour candidate at the last election, there had been a Labour candidate in January 1910, who finished bottom of the poll. For this by-election, John Robertson was selected as the Labour candidate and was sponsored by the Scottish Miners' Federation. This was the first instance in the 1910-18 parliament in which Liberal and Labour candidates had opposed each other. Labour's intervention to contest this Liberal seat gave the Unionists a real hope of winning.

Result

Labour's share of the vote was well down on the share they achieved in this seat in both 1901 and 1904.

Aftermath
A General Election was due to take place by the end of 1915. By the autumn of 1914, the following candidates had been adopted to contest that election. Due to the outbreak of war, the election never took place.

Following boundary changes, most of the seat made up Bothwell for the 1918 general election. Millar moved on to contest neighbouring Motherwell where he was defeated. Goff went off to contest Cleveland where he was elected. Robertson remained to contest Bothwell:

References

 Craig, F. W. S. (1974). British parliamentary election results 1885-1918 (1 ed.). London: Macmillan. 
 Who's Who: www.ukwhoswho.com
 Debrett's House of Commons 1916

North East Lanarkshire by-election
1910s elections in Scotland
North East Lanarkshire by-election
North East Lanarkshire by-election
Lanarkshire
Lanarkshire, North East